Amaliendorf-Aalfang is a town in the district of Gmünd in the Austrian state of Lower Austria.

Geography
Amaliendorf-Aalfang lies in the Waldviertel in Lower Austria. Only about 41.38 percent of the municipality is forested.

References

External links
Municipal website

Cities and towns in Gmünd District